BFP may refer to:

 Back focal plane, an optics term
 Batters faced by pitcher or batters facing pitcher, a statistic in baseball
 Beaver County Airport, an airport near Beaver, PA with IATA code BFP
 Big Fat Positive, in reference to pregnancy tests
 Binary floating point, floating point systems based on radix 2
 Block floating point, a calculation scheme using a common exponent
 Blue fluorescent protein, a derivative of the Green fluorescent protein
 Body fat percentage, a value which shows what percent of the body is fat
 Boiler feedwater pump, mostly used in a power plant.
 Bona fide purchaser, a term in property law
 Born from Pain, a metalcore band from the Netherlands
 British First Party, a far-right British nationalist party
 Brain Force Plus, a medication from Infowars endorsed by Alex Jones
 Bureau of Fire Protection, a Philippine government agency
 Bund Freikirchlicher Pfingstgemeinden, a Pentecostal denomination in Germany
The Burlington Free Press, a Burlington, Vermont-based digital and print newspaper